The following is a list of football stadiums in Germany with a total capacity of at least 20,000 spectators. Below a list with stadiums with a capacity of at least 10,000. Stadiums in bold are part of the 2022-23 Bundesliga.

German football stadiums below 20,000 capacity

Maps

StadiumDB identifier

References

See also 
 List of European stadiums by capacity
 List of association football stadiums by capacity
 List of indoor arenas in Germany

 
Germany
Stadiums
Football stadiums